Lesley Thomson  is a Scottish lawyer who served as the Solicitor General for Scotland from 2011 to 2016. She was appointed to the office on 19 May 2011, after the Scottish Parliament election, succeeding Frank Mulholland who was promoted to Lord Advocate.

Legal career 
Thomson began her career as a lawyer with SSEB and then became a Procurator Fiscal in 1985. She spent most of her career on fraudulent related crimes, prosecuting those involved and seizing the assets of criminals. She served as the Area Procurator Fiscal for Selkirk, Edinburgh and later as interim for Lothian & Borders. In May 2008, she was appointed area procurator fiscal for Glasgow.

Thomson led on trial advocacy and deaths investigation within the Crown Office and Procurator Fiscal Service (COPFS). She is an acknowledged specialist in the prosecution of serious crime, including organised crime and financial crime, and an expert in the proceeds of crime legislation, having authored a textbook on criminal confiscation. In 2013 she became the first woman to be appointed to Scottish Rugby's board.

Notes
 

Living people
Solicitors General for Scotland
Year of birth missing (living people)
Scottish women lawyers
20th-century Scottish lawyers
21st-century Scottish lawyers
Women members of the Scottish Government
Women Law Officers of the Crown in the United Kingdom
Alumni of the University of Glasgow
People educated at the High School of Glasgow
Lawyers from Glasgow
Scottish lawyers
20th-century women lawyers
21st-century women lawyers
20th-century Scottish women